Alberto Eugenio Cardemil Herrera (born 1 November 1945) is a Chilean politician.

References

External links
 BCN Profile

1945 births
Living people
20th-century Chilean politicians
21st-century Chilean politicians
Pontifical Catholic University of Chile alumni
National Renewal (Chile) politicians
20th-century Chilean lawyers
Members of the Chamber of Deputies of Chile
People from Colchagua Province